D414 is the main state road on Pelješac peninsula in Croatia connecting towns of Ston and Orebić and ferry ports in Orebić, Trpanj and Prapratno, from where Jadrolinija ferries fly to islands of Korčula and Mljet as well as the mainland port of Ploče, connecting to the D118, D413 and D123 state roads respectively.

The road, as well as all other state roads in Croatia, is managed and maintained by Hrvatske ceste, a state-owned company.

Traffic volume 

Traffic is regularly counted and reported by Hrvatske ceste (HC), operator of the road. Furthermore, the HC report number of vehicles using Orebić – Korčula (Dominče) ferry line, connecting the D414 road to the D118 state road. Substantial variations between annual (AADT) and summer (ASDT) traffic volumes are attributed to the fact that the road connects a number of Adriatic Sea resorts to the mainland.

Road junctions and populated areas

Sources

State roads in Croatia
Transport in Dubrovnik-Neretva County